This is a list of fictional characters with disabilities in various mediums, including novels, comics, television, and movies. A disability may be readily visible, or invisible in nature. Some examples of invisible disabilities include intellectual disabilities, autism spectrum disorder, attention deficit hyperactivity disorder, mental disorders, asthma, epilepsy, allergies, migraines, arthritis, and chronic fatigue syndrome. There are many different causes of disability that often affect basic activities of daily living, such as eating, dressing, transferring, and maintaining personal hygiene; or advanced activities of daily living such as shopping, food preparation, driving, or working. However, causes of disability are usually determined by a person's capability to perform the activities of daily life.

Due to the number of entries, this page does not include autistic fictional characters.

The names are organized alphabetically by surname, or by single name if the character does not have a surname.

Comics and manga

Literature

Film

Television

See also
 List of fictional characters with bipolar disorder
 List of deaf superheroes
 List of blind people#Fictional
 Disability in the arts
 Disability in the media
 Disability culture

References 

 
Fictional characters with disabilities, List of
disabilities